Mary Sullivan Heath is an American educator and politician. She has served as a member of the New Hampshire House of Representatives, representing Hillsborough 14, since 2013. She is a Democrat and serves as the House's Majority Floor Leader. She is the former dean of the School of Education at Southern New Hampshire University.

Early life and career

In 2009, she became dean of the School of Education at Southern New Hampshire University.

Politics

She has served as a member of the New Hampshire House of Representatives, representing Hillsborough 14, since 2013. She is a Democrat and serves as the House's Majority Floor Leader.

In 2019, she was awarded the New Hampshire Democrat's Flag Day Award for her "incredible impact" on the Democratic Party.

She endorsed Michael Bennet during his 2020 presidential campaign.

References

External links

Mary Heath's official page from the New Hampshire House of Representatives

Democratic Party members of the New Hampshire House of Representatives
Women state legislators in New Hampshire
Southern New Hampshire University faculty
Year of birth missing (living people)
Living people
21st-century American politicians
21st-century American women politicians
American women academics